Karen B. decker  is the American Chargé d’Affaires to Afghanistan since August 1, 2022.  She replaced Ian McCary who was also Chargé d’Affaires.

Career
She is a Career Foreign Service Officer (FSO) who previously served as the Director for Afghanistan Operations for the Afghan Relocation Effort (CARE) from September 2021-August 2022,  decker was, from September 2018 to September 2020, Deputy Chief of Mission of the U.S. Embassy in Kabul and Senior Civilian Representative in eastern Afghanistan.

Twitter controversy

Decker ended up apologizing after one of her tweets brought a great deal of negative attention.  She had said “Afghan girls and women need a ‘movement’ similar to ‘Black Girl Magic’ as they remain starved of even their basic rights under Taliban leadership, has apologized.”. The tweet was deleted. Posted in February 2023 to honor Black History Month, some have characterized the tweet as “tone deaf.”

In November 2022, Decker had talked about Afghani women she met in Pakistan who had “fire n their eyes”, eager to return to Afghanistan “but are afraid of forced marriages and denial of work and education.“

References

American women diplomats
Living people